Penicillin or 1B75 Penicillin is an acoustic-thermal artillery-reconnaissance system developed by Ruselectronics for the Russian Armed Forces. The system aims to detect and locate enemy artillery, mortars, MLRs,  anti-aircraft or tactical-missile firing positions with seismic and acoustic sensors, without emitting any radio waves. Penicillin completed state trials in December 2018 and entered combat duty in 2020.

Design
The Penicillin is mounted on the 8x8 Kamaz-6350 chassis and consists of a 1B75 sensor suite placed on a telescopic boom for the infrared and visible spectrum as well as of several ground-installed seismic and acoustic receivers as a part of the 1B76 sensor suite. One system can reportedly cover an entire division against an enemy fire. Besides that, it co-ordinates and corrects a friendly artillery fire.

Operators
 
 Russian Ground Forces

See also
 Zoopark-1
 Aistyonok
 ARTHUR (radar)
 AN/TPQ-37 Firefinder radar
 Swathi Weapon Locating Radar

References

Ruselectronics
Counter-battery radars
Modern military equipment of Russia
Military electronics of Russia
Military equipment introduced in the 2010s